Jonathan Williams (born September 17, 1996) is an American former professional basketball player.

He played college basketball for four seasons with the Virginia Commonwealth University Rams. In 2018, he played his first professional season for Aris Leeuwarden in the Netherlands.

College career 
As a junior, Williams averaged 8.3 points and 3.1 assists per game but did not shoot the ball particularly well. In his final season with VCU, Williams averaged a career-high 9.3 points and 5.7 assists per game, which made him the assists leader of the Atlantic 10 Conference.

Professional career
On July 14, 2018, Williams signed with Aris Leeuwarden of the Dutch Basketball League. On December 11, 2018, Williams left Aris after he asked for the termination of his contract to focus on recovery from injury. He played two games with Aris, in which he averaged 8 points and 2 rebounds per game.

References

1996 births
Living people
American expatriate basketball people in the Netherlands
American men's basketball players
Aris Leeuwarden players
Basketball players from New Jersey
Basketball players from Richmond, Virginia
Point guards
VCU Rams men's basketball players